Anthidium cockerelli is a species of bee in the family Megachilidae, the leaf-cutter, carder, or mason bees.

Distribution
Middle America and North America

References

cockerelli
Insects described in 1928